Nikola Manojlović (born 14 February 2002) is a Serbian professional basketball player who currently plays for FMP of the ABA League as a loaned player of Crvena zvezda mts.

Playing career 
Born in Novi Sad, Manojlović grew up in the Belgrade-based Crvena zvezda youth system. On 27 February 2020, Manojlović signed his first professional contract for Crvena zvezda mts. In September 2020, he was loaned to Tamiš for the 2020–21 BLS season. Prior to the 2021–22 season, Manojlović was added to the roster of Slodes. Afterwards, he was loaned to FMP on 28 December 2021.

National team career
In August 2018, Manojlović was a member of the Serbian under-16 national team that participated at the FIBA U16 European Championship in Novi Sad, Serbia. Over seven tournament games, he averaged 14 points, 5.1 rebounds, and 1.9 assists per game. In July/August 2019, Manojlović was a member of the Serbian under-18 national team that participated at the FIBA U18 European Championship in Volos, Greece. Over seven tournament games, he averaged 0.6 points, 1.6 rebounds, and 1.7 assists per game.

In July 2022, Manojlović was a member of the Serbian under-20 national team that won a gold medal at the 2022 FIBA U20 European Championship Division B in Tbilisi, Georgia. Over seven tournament games, he averaged 7.6 points, 3.6 rebounds, and 3.1 assists per game.

References

External links 
 Nikola Manojlovic at eurobasket.com
 Nikola Manojlovic at euroleague.net
 Nikola Manojlovic at realgm.com
 Nikola Manojlovic at ABA League
 Nikola Manojlovic at proballers.com

2002 births
Living people
ABA League players
Basketball League of Serbia players
Basketball players from Novi Sad
KK Crvena zvezda youth players
KK FMP players
KK Tamiš players
KK Slodes players
Serbian men's basketball players
Shooting guards
Small forwards